Heart of Glass may refer to:

 Heart of Glass (film), a 1976 film directed by Werner Herzog
 "Heart of Glass" (song), a 1979 song by Blondie
 "Heart of Glass", a song by Celine Dion from Courage
 Heart of Glass (novel), a 2007 novel in the A-List series by Zoey Dean
 "Heart of Glass" (CSI: NY), a television episode

See also
 Herz aus Glas (disambiguation)
 Glassheart, a 2012 album by Leona Lewis
 "Glassheart" (song), a song from the album
 ''Cœur de verre, an album by Hélène Ségara